Antar Boucherit (born 18 December 1983) is an Algerian football player who is currently playing as a midfielder for USM Annaba in the Algerian Ligue Professionnelle 2.

In January 2008, he was called up by Rabah Saadane to the Algeria A' national team for a 5-day training camp.

References

External links
 DZFoot.com Profile
 USM-Alger.com Profile
 

1983 births
Algerian footballers
Living people
USM Alger players
ES Sétif players
Algerian Ligue Professionnelle 1 players
USM Annaba players
JSM Béjaïa players
Association football midfielders
21st-century Algerian people